Emadabad may refer to:
 Emadabad, Marvdasht, Fars Province
 Emadabad, Kerman
 Emadabad, Anbarabad, Kerman Province